Jack Thomas Snow Jr. (born February 26, 1968) is an American former professional baseball player and television sports  color commentator. Snow excelled as a defensive player, winning six consecutive Gold Glove Awards as a first baseman between 1995 and 2000. After his playing career, Snow worked in radio and television broadcasting. He has also worked as a special assistant to the General Manager for the Giants.

Early life
Snow was born in Long Beach, California to former NFL player Jack Snow and Merry Carole Shane, who died in 1998 from thyroid cancer. He has two sisters, Michelle and Stephanie.

His father worked with him at first base, throwing balls from shortstop purposely in the dirt to improve his fielding skills. He played recreational baseball in Seal Beach, for what is now known as, Seal Beach PONY. Snow attended Los Alamitos High School in Los Alamitos, California and was awarded All-Orange County honors in baseball, football, and basketball. He played safety his junior year (1984) and quarterback his senior year (1985) on the varsity football team. Receiver Rob Katzaroff set an Orange County record with 93 single-season receptions (a record which still stands after the 2017 season) while Snow played quarterback. On the basketball team, Snow played point guard. On the baseball team, Snow played with future Giants reliever Robb Nen and future UCLA Bruins outfielder Katzaroff. All three Griffin baseball players from the 1985 season were eventually drafted to play minor league baseball.

University of Arizona
After high school, Snow attended the University of Arizona and played three seasons for the Arizona Wildcats baseball team, where his teammates included Kenny Lofton, Alan Zinter, Scott Erickson, Trevor Hoffman, and Kevin Long. In 1988, he played collegiate summer baseball for the Orleans Cardinals of the Cape Cod Baseball League.

Professional career

New York Yankees
The New York Yankees selected Snow in the fifth round of the 1989 Major League Baseball draft. He made his major league debut with the Yankees at the end of the 1992 season.

California Angels (1993–96)
After the 1992 season, the Yankees traded Snow, Jerry Nielsen, and Russ Springer to the California Angels for Jim Abbott. Snow played for the Angels from 1993 to 1996, where he won two Gold Glove Awards.

San Francisco Giants (1997–2005)
Snow was traded to the Giants after the 1996 season for left-handed pitcher Allen Watson and minor league pitcher Fausto Macey.

While a switch-hitter earlier in his career, Snow batted exclusively left-handed after 1998. In 2000, he led the league in sacrifice flies with 14. After a two-year injury-riddled stretch from 2002 to 2003 when his batting average was .246, Snow rebounded in 2004 with a .327 average, hitting .387 after the All-Star break (which ranked second only to Ichiro Suzuki in the Major Leagues).

On June 26, 1999, Snow tagged out Los Angeles Dodgers pitcher Carlos Pérez using the "hidden ball trick", the last successful execution of the play in the 20th century.

In the 2000 National League Division Series against the New York Mets, with the Giants trailing 4–1 in the bottom of the ninth, Snow hit a three-run pinch-hit homer against Mets reliever Armando Benítez. However, the Giants failed to capitalize on their momentum, eventually falling in the 10th inning and going on to lose the series.

In the 2002 World Series, Snow was scoring a run in Game 5 off a Kenny Lofton triple and lifted 3-year-old Darren Baker, the Giants' batboy and son of then Giants’ manager Dusty Baker, by the jacket as he was crossing home plate.  Darren had run out to collect Lofton's bat before the play was completed.  This turned into a touching and memorable incident, but easily could have resulted in disaster with a small child wandering into the path of Snow and David Bell as they both barreled home to score. Following the incident with Darren Baker, Major League Baseball required batboys and girls to be at least 14 years of age. A photograph of this incident now hangs in the Baseball Hall of Fame, in Cooperstown, New York.

In the 2003 National League Division Series against the Florida Marlins, with the Giants trailing 7–6 in Game 4 in the ninth inning, he attempted to score from second base on a single to left field, but Jeff Conine's throw to the plate came in time as catcher Iván Rodríguez tagged Snow at the plate as Snow barreled into him, ending the game and the series. According to the Elias Sports Bureau, it was the first postseason series to end with the potential tying run thrown out at the plate.

Boston Red Sox (2006)
Snow's tenure with the Giants effectively ended when the team declined to offer him salary arbitration before the 2006 season. He signed a one-year, $2 million contract with the Boston Red Sox on January 6, 2006. After his father's death in 2006, Snow wore his father's number 84 in his honor. He served primarily in a platoon with Kevin Youkilis at first base until he requested to be designated for assignment due to a lack of playing time. He was granted his designation June 19, and was officially released eight days later.

Retirement
At the end of the 2006 season, Snow retired from baseball and began working as a color commentator on Giants radio broadcasts alongside play-by-play announcer Dave Flemming. He has also served as an advisor to the Giants' general manager, Brian Sabean, and as a roving minor league instructor for the Giants.  Since 2013, he has worked as a college baseball broadcaster for the Pac-12 Network.

On September 24, 2008, the Giants signed Snow to a one-day contract to allow him to retire as a Giant. However, rather than immediately retiring after signing the symbolic contract and receiving no actual pay as is usually done, Snow was penciled into the starting lineup and took the field on September 27 against the Dodgers, but was replaced before the first pitch. It was a move that allowed Snow to officially take the field as a Giants player one last time. Eugenio Vélez, Omar Vizquel, and Rich Aurilia threw balls in the dirt to mess with Snow during fielding practice prior to the first pitch, but Snow still made the plays. For his brief official appearance,  he received the prorated league minimum salary of $2,100.

Career statistics

In 28 postseason games, Snow batted .327 (32-for-98) with 11 runs, 3 home runs and 15 RBI.

Personal life
Snow lives in Northern California with his wife Gina.

References

External links

1968 births
Living people
Albany-Colonie Yankees players
American expatriate baseball players in Canada
Arizona Wildcats baseball players
Baseball players from Los Angeles
Boston Red Sox players
California Angels players
Columbus Clippers players
Fresno Grizzlies players
Gold Glove Award winners
International League MVP award winners
Major League Baseball first basemen
New York Yankees players
Oneonta Yankees players
Orleans Firebirds players
Baseball players from Long Beach, California
San Francisco Giants announcers
San Francisco Giants players
Vancouver Canadians players
Anchorage Glacier Pilots players
Peninsula Oilers players